Mark Burnett (born 17 July 1960) is a television producer who is the former Chairman of MGM Worldwide Television Group. He created and produced the reality shows The Apprentice, Survivor, The Voice, and Shark Tank (which has been nominated for six NAACP Image Awards).

Burnett-produced TV series have been nominated for a total of 143 Emmys. He has personally won twelve Emmy Awards, five Producers Guild of America Awards, ten Critics' Choice Television Awards, and nine People's Choice Awards. As of 2022, Burnett is the executive producer of five current network television shows, as well as several cable series. For five consecutive years, Burnett has been included in the Variety500, an index of the 500 most influential business leaders shaping the global media industry.

Under Burnett's leadership, MGM has expanded its cable TV business through the acquisitions of Evolution Media (e.g., Botched, Real Housewives of Beverly Hills, Real Housewives of Orange County) and Big Fish Entertainment (Live PD, Black Ink Crew).

Burnett additionally produced the Christian media series The Bible and A.D. The Bible Continues, as well as the feature films Son of God, Little Boy, Woodlawn, and Ben-Hur.

Early life
Burnett was born on 17 July 1960 in London, the only child of Archie and Jean Burnett, both Ford Motors factory workers, and was raised in Dagenham, Essex. His father was a Roman Catholic and his mother was a Presbyterian; it is not known in which denomination he was raised. At the age of 17, he enlisted in the British Army, and became a Section Commander in the Parachute Regiment. From 1978 to 1982 he served with the 3rd Battalion, Parachute Regiment in C Company and saw action during the Falklands War and Northern Ireland. After his service, he initially planned to go to Central America and work as a "weapons and tactics adviser".

Early career
In October 1982, Burnett immigrated to the United States, where his friend Nick Hill, who had emigrated from the UK earlier, was working as a nanny and chauffeur. Hill knew of an open position for a live-in nanny with the Jaeger family in affluent Beverly Hills. Despite having no experience as a nanny, Burnett went on the interview. The Jaegers, realizing the advantage of having a nanny and security at the same time, hired him. After a year of working for the Jaegers, he moved on to another family in Malibu, California, taking care of two boys for $250 a week. He was eventually given a position in the insurance office owned by the boys' father. Two years later, Burnett rented a portion of a fence at Venice Beach in Los Angeles, and sold T-shirts for $18 each during weekends. Realizing he made more money selling T-shirts, he left his insurance job.

In 1991, Burnett and four others joined a French adventure competition, the Raid Gauloises. Afterward, Burnett saw a business opportunity in holding similar competitions. He purchased the format rights and brought a similar competition, Eco-Challenge, to America. Eco-Challenge launched Burnett's career as a television producer.

Productions

Burnett first produced the expedition race show Eco-Challenge in 1995. This led to the hit reality show Survivor which premiered in the summer of 2000 and was the most watched summer series since Sonny and Cher. Survivor was named the Number 1 reality series of all time by Entertainment Weekly in 2009.

In 2004, NBC premiered The Apprentice, a reality television series in which contestants competed for a job under real estate magnate and former President Donald Trump.

Burnett has produced several other television franchises including: Are You Smarter than a 5th Grader?, Shark Tank, The Voice, Beat Shazam, Coupled and TKO: Total Knock Out. He has maintained a strong presence in award show franchises, having produced the MTV Movie Awards (2007–2011), the annual People's Choice Awards (2010–2017), the Spike Video Game Awards (2011 & 2012) and the 2011 63rd Primetime Emmy Awards.

Burnett has produced more than 3,200 hours of television programming which regularly airs in more than 70 countries. Past shows include Celebrity Apprentice (NBC), Bully Beatdown, Combat Missions, The Contender, The Contender Asia, Expedition Africa, Expedition Impossible, How'd You Get So Rich?, Martha Stewart, My Dad Is Better than Your Dad, On the Lot (a collaboration with Steven Spielberg), Pirate Master, The Restaurant, Rock Star, Sarah Palin's Alaska, Stars Earn Stripes, Starmaker, Toughest Cowboy, and Wedding Day.

As well as his ongoing productions, Burnett and his wife, actress Roma Downey, produced The Bible, a 10-hour History Channel drama based upon stories of the Bible. The Bible became the No. 1 new series on cable TV in 2013 and was the No. 1 series in Canada, Spain, and Portugal. In total, with subsequent airings, The Bible was seen by more than 100 million viewers.

After the success of The Bible, Burnett and Downey started developing more faith-based scripted series. A.D. The Bible Continues premiered on NBC on Easter Sunday 2015, and The Dovekeepers miniseries aired on CBS in Spring 2015.

In September 2014, MGM acquired a 55 percent interest in One Three Media and LightWorkers Media. The two companies were consolidated into a new film and television company, United Artists Media Group which was then acquired fully by MGM in 2015.

In December 2015, Burnett was named president of MGM Television and Digital Group, signing a five-year deal. Burnett's appointment was set up to occur simultaneously with the closing of MGM's acquisition of the remaining 45 percent of Hearst's, Burnett's and Roma Downey's interests in United Artists Media Group (UAMG), which would be absorbed under the MGM Television Group umbrella. MGM Television would now have numerous unscripted and scripted television shows airing on network and cable or in production including: The Voice (NBC); Survivor (CBS); Shark Tank (ABC); Beyond the Tank (ABC); Celebrity Apprentice (NBC); Fargo (FX); Vikings (HISTORY); Teen Wolf (MTV); 500 Questions (ABC); The People's Choice Awards (CBS); LIGHT TV, Lucha Underground (El Rey Network), and America's Greatest Makers (INTEL/Turner). In June 2018, MGM appointed Burnett as Chairman of MGM Worldwide Television.

As of 2022, Burnett is the executive producer of five network television shows: Generation Gap (ABC), Beat Shazam (FOX), Shark Tank (ABC), Survivor (CBS) and The Voice (NBC). Burnett is also the executive producer of the cable series Lucha Underground (The El Rey Network) and The Contender (EPIX). In 2017, Burnett had timeslot winning shows on six nights out of seven. Moreover, as Chairman of MGM Worldwide Television he oversees scripted television shows including, Fargo (FX), The Handmaid's Tale (Hulu), Vikings and Vikings: Valhalla (Netflix).

Personal life
Burnett's first wife was Kym Gold, but that marriage only lasted about a year.  Before that marriage ended he met Dianne J. Burnett (née Valentine) and they married in 1992; they have two sons together, James and Cameron. In 2014, Cameron survived a neuroendocrine tumor at the age of 17, had brain surgery and had to learn to walk again. He was awarded the 2015 Courage Award at the Visionary Ball which raises money each year for UCLA's Department of Neurosurgery.

The couple filed for legal separation in September 2002 and a judgment for legal separation was granted in December 2003; they divorced in 2006. In January 2004, Burnett began dating Roma Downey. In November 2006, while the two were vacationing with their children in Zihuatanejo, Mexico, he proposed to her. They wed on 28 April 2007 in their Malibu home. The ceremony was officiated by Downey's former co-star, Della Reese.

Awards, honors and affiliations
In 2004, Time magazine called Burnett one of the Most Influential People in the World Today. Burnett was also named "Philanthropist of the Year" by the Reality Cares Foundation. He has won both Brandweek's "Marketer of the Year Award", the prestigious Rose d'Or Frapa Format Award, the Brandon Tartikoff Legacy Award and the Norman Lear Award from the Producers Guild of America.

Burnett served for two years on the board of directors for the British Academy of Film and Television Arts. In November 2007, Burnett was elected into the Broadcast & Cable Hall of Fame and in 2008, it was announced that he would be honoured with a star on the Hollywood Walk of Fame. On 8 July 2009, Burnett received a star at 6664 Hollywood Blvd. In June 2011, Burnett was elected into the Producers Guild of America Council Board of Delegates and currently serves on the Producers Council. He is an ambassador for Operation Smile.

In 2013, the ten-hour mini-series The Bible received the Parents Television Council 2013 Seal of Approval. Shark Tank, The Voice, and Survivor were all nominated for Critics Choice Awards, at which the Voice won for Best Reality Series – Competition. The three shows were nominated for the Television Critics Association Awards, at which Shark Tank won for Outstanding Achievement in Reality Programming.

In 2013, The Voice, Shark Tank and The Bible were nominated for Primetime Emmy Awards; The Voice won for Outstanding Reality – Competition Program. The Voice and Shark Tank were nominated at the 2015 Critics' Choice Television Awards, at which Shark Tank won for Best Reality Series.

In 2014, Burnett was named the "Number 1 Reality Producer" on The Hollywood Reporter Reality Power List.

In 2014, Burnett and his wife Roma Downey were recipients of the Anti-Defamation League's Entertainment Industry Award. He and Downey are heavily involved with philanthropic organizations Operation Smile and Compassion International. In 2015, they partnered with the Institute for Global Engagement to launch the Cradle Fund (TCF). TCF is focused on raising $25 million to help Middle Eastern minorities displaced by ISIS to return to a home where they can practice their faith without fear. As of 2019, they have helped more than 10,000 displaced Christian refugees to relocate.

Awards

Special Awards 
2004: Brandweek Marketer of the Year Award 
2004: Reality Cares Foundation 'Philanthropist of the Year'
2004: 'Brandon Tartikoff Legacy Award'
2004: Time Magazine: 'Time 100: 100 Most Influential People in the World Today'
2005: Rose d'Or Frapa Format Award
2009: Producers Guild of America 'Norman Lear Award'
2009: Hollywood Walk of Fame Star: 'Excellence in Television'
2010: Producers Guild of America 'Lifetime Achievement Award in Television'
2013: TV Guide Magazine 'Producer of the Year'
2013: The Dove Foundation Recognition of 'Son of God'
2014: Anti-Defamation League 'Entertainment Award'

Nominations and wins
As reflected in the following chart, Burnett has been nominated for many television industry awards between 1999 and 2018, including Emmy Awards, Critics Choice Awards, Producers Guild of America Awards, People's Choice Awards, and more.

Published works
Mark Burnett; Martin Dugard (2000). Survivor: the Ultimate Game. New York: TV Books, L. L. C. .

See also
 List of television producers

References

External links

 
 
 SWINDLE Magazine Interview with Mark Burnett
 Corporate page

1960 births
American evangelicals
American reality television producers
Television producers from California
British Army personnel of the Falklands War
British Christians
British emigrants to the United States
British expatriates in the United States
British Parachute Regiment soldiers
Businesspeople from California
Businesspeople from London
Emmy Award winners
Living people
People from Dagenham
People from Malibu, California
Primetime Emmy Award winners